Saputara ropeway, officially Pushpak ropeway, is a ropeway in Saputara, Dang district, Gujarat, India.

History
The construction of ropeway started in 1987.

The ropeway starts from Sunset point and takes to the Sunrise point and Governor's hill. It is suspended above a lake. It offers view of the town and valley.

See also
 Aerial lift in India
 Girnar ropeway
 Pavagadh ropeway
 Ambaji ropeway

References

Transport in Gujarat
Aerial tramways in India
Buildings and structures in Gujarat
Dang district, India
Tourist attractions in Gujarat